Tutku may refer to:

Tutku, Estonia, village in Saaremaa Parish, Saare County, Estonia
Tutku Açık (born 1980), Turkish basketball player
Tutkusu, Turkish studio album by Erkin Koray

Turkish unisex given names